Kankossa  is a town and commune the Assaba region of Mauritania.

Communes of Mauritania